Marion McCarthy is a former camogie player, winner of the B+I Star of the Year award in 1980. and All Ireland medals in 1978, 1980, 1982 and 1983. She won National League medals in 1984, 1986 and 1991. She is the only player in camogie history to win All Ireland medals as an outfield player and, after 1980, as a goalkeeper. She was selected as Cork camogie player of the year in 1980.

References

Living people
Year of birth missing (living people)
Cork camogie players